Yaseh Chah (also Romanized as Yāseh Chāh) is a village in Hureh Rural District, Saman District, Shahrekord County, Chaharmahal and Bakhtiari Province, Iran. At the 2006 census, its population was 702, in 222 families. The village is populated by Turkic people.

References 

Populated places in Saman County